TalkingCock.com is a Singaporean satirical and humour website. The website features various articles and jokes spoofing Singapore current affairs, which occasionally pokes fun of world happenings. "Talking cock", which describes the act of engaging in idle banter or perhaps more literally "talking nonsense", is a common phrase in Singlish.

Started in August 2000 by Colin Goh, a film director, cartoonist and former lawyer, the website provides commentary and pokes fun at local news and issues, in particular political, with much of its content written by anonymous contributors. It has established notability over the years, with mention given by the Singapore parliament, the foreign media, and Prime Minister Lee Hsien Loong in his 2006 National Day Rally speech. In a country of 4.4 million people (as of 2006), the popular website receives 4 million hits per month.

It is also home of the Coxford Singlish Dictionary, which is the de facto Singlish dictionary frequently quoted off by the local press. It has also led a campaign against the government's attempts of discouraging the use of Singlish. Its comic, Alien Talent, is published on tabloid The New Paper daily.

The website inspired a movie, Talking Cock the Movie, also directed by Goh.

TalkingCock.com is currently on an indefinite hiatus, since January 2010.

See also

 Singlish
 Culture of Singapore

References

Singaporean entertainment websites
Singlish
Slang dictionaries
2000 establishments in Singapore
Internet properties established in 2000